Smashcast was a live streaming platform that materialised after the merger of Azubu and Hitbox in May 2017.

History 
Azubu's acquisition of Hitbox was announced in January 2017. At the time, they announced they were "launch a new platform, focused on optimizing the mobile user experience and monetization technologies, strengthened by our internally developed technologies, technical partner relationships and a passionate team dedicated to pushing the boundaries of video game live streaming."

On May 9, 2017, both the Azubu and Hitbox websites were shut down and redirected traffic to Smashcast. With focus on eSports, the service announced new features, such as the "Hype-o-Meter" (a viewer engagement feature that helps eSports fan cheer for their favorite teams), a feed on every profile page, and an integration with Discord. In an interview with Redbull, CEO Mike McGarvey said that Smashcast was "the largest independent eSports broadcaster outside of Asia" with more than 10 million users.

Support for Smashcast officially ceased November 22, 2020.

References

External links
 

Video game websites
Former video hosting services
Video hosting
Entertainment companies established in 2017
Internet properties established in 2017
Mass media companies established in 2017
Software companies established in 2017
Video game streaming services